The Greek frigate Salamis (F-455) is the fourth ship of the Greek Hydra frigate class. It is based on the Blohm + Voss MEKO 200 frigate class and was built by Hellenic Shipyards Co. at Skaramagas. It is the third ship of the Hellenic Navy to be named after Salamis Island and the famous Battle of Salamis, the first being the uncompleted dreadnought Salamis.

External links
Official Hellenic Navy page for Hydra Class Frigates

Ships built in Greece
1996 ships
Hydra-class frigates
Frigates of Greece